The British Academy Television Craft Awards of 2011 are presented by the British Academy of Film and Television Arts (BAFTA) and were held on 8 May 2011 at The Brewery, London, the ceremony was hosted by Stephen Mangan.

Winners and nominees
Winners will be listed first and highlighted in boldface.

{| class="wikitable"
|-
! style="background:#BDB76B; width:50%" |  Best Director - Fiction/Entertainment
! style="background:#BDB76B; width:50%" |  Best Director - Factual
|-
| valign="top" |
 Brian Percival – Downton Abbey
 Paul McGuigan – Sherlock (Episode: "A Study in Pink")
 Shane Meadows – This Is England '86
 Charles Sturridge – The Road to Coronation Street
| valign="top" |
 Dan Reed – Dispatches (Episode: "The Battle for Haiti")
 Gideon Bradshaw, Paul Olding – Wonders of the Solar System (Episode: "Empire of the Sun")
 Nicolas Brown – Human Planet (Episode: "Arctic – Life in the Deep Freeze")
 Chris Holt – Wonders of the Solar System (Episode: "The Thin Blue Line")
|-
|-
! style="background:#BDB76B; width:50%" |  Best Director - Multi-Camera
! style="background:#BDB76B; width:50%" |  Best Writer
|-
| valign="top" |
 Tony Prescott – Coronation Street - Live Episode
 Jonathan Bullen – The X Factor
 Juliet May – Miranda
 Nikki Parsons – Strictly Come Dancing
| valign="top" |
 Peter Bowker – Eric and Ernie
 Jo Brand, Joanna Scanlan, Vicki Pepperdine – Getting On
 Stephen Butchard – Five Daughters
 Iain Morris, Damon Beesley – The Inbetweeners
|-
|-
! style="background:#BDB76B; width:50%" |  Best Original Television Music
! style="background:#BDB76B; width:50%" |  Best Breakthrough Talent
|-
| valign="top" |
 Any Human Heart – Dan Jones Sherlock (Episode: "A Study in Pink") – David Arnold, Michael Price
 Terry Pratchett's Going Postal – John Lunn
 Misfits – Vince Pope
| valign="top" |
 Jon Brown – Mongrels
 Caroline Skinner – Five Days
 Dave Whyte – Pete versus Life 
 Aaron Young – Battle of Britain: The Real Story
|-
|-
! style="background:#BDB76B; width:50%" |  Best Costume Design
! style="background:#BDB76B; width:50%" |  Best Production Design
|-
| valign="top" |
 Worried About the Boy – Annie Symons Eric and Ernie – Joanna Eatwell
 Any Human Heart – Charlotte Holdich
 This Is England '86 – Charlotte Walter
| valign="top" |
 Misfits – Tom Bowyer Eric and Ernie – Pat Campbell
 Downton Abbey – Donal Woods
 Sherlock (Episode: "A Study in Pink") – Arwel Wyn Jones
|-
|-
! style="background:#BDB76B; width:50%" |  Best Make-Up and Hair Design
! style="background:#BDB76B; width:50%" |  Best Visual Effects
|-
| valign="top" |
 This Is England '86 – Catherine Scoble Eric and Ernie – Christina Baker
 Any Human Heart – Karen Hartley-Thomas
 Psychoville – Penny Smith
| valign="top" |
 Merlin – The Mill Wonders of the Solar System – Simon Clarke, Stephen Waugh
 Doctor Who – The Mill
 Terry Pratchett's Going Postal – Simon Thomas, Reuben Barkataki, Zoltan Benyó
|-
|-
! style="background:#BDB76B; width:50%" |  Best Photography and Lighting - Fiction/Entertainment
! style="background:#BDB76B; width:50%" |  Best Photography - Factual
|-
| valign="top" |
 South Riding – Alan Almond Terry Pratchett's Going Postal – Gavin Finney
 Downton Abbey – David Katznelson
 Five Daughters – Chris Seager
 Any Human Heart – Wojciech Szepel
| valign="top" |
 Human Planet (Episode: "Arctic – Life in the Deep Freeze") – Will Edwards, Doug Allan, Matt Norman Human Planet (Episode: "Oceans – Into the Blue") – Simon Enderby, Robin Cox, Richard Wollocombe
 David Attenborough's First Life – Pete Hayns, Paul Williams
 Human Planet (Episode: "Jungles – People of the Trees") – Gavin Thurston, Robin Cox, Pete Hayns
|-
|-
! style="background:#BDB76B; width:50%" |  Best Editing - Fiction/Entertainment
! style="background:#BDB76B; width:50%" |  Best Editing - Factual
|-
| valign="top" |
 Sherlock (Episode: "A Study in Pink") – Charlie Phillips Eric and Ernie – Jamie Pearson
 Downton Abbey – John Wilson
 This Is England '86 – Chris Wyatt
| valign="top" |
 Human Planet (Episode: "Arctic – Life in the Deep Freeze") – Jason Savage Dispatches (Episode: "The Battle for Haiti") – Peter Haddon
 Wonders of the Solar System (Episode: "Empire of the Sun") – Darren Jonusas
 David Attenborough's First Life – Peter Miller
 Concorde's Last Flight – Peter Norrey
|-
|-
! style="background:#BDB76B; width:50%" |  Best Sound - Fiction/Entertainment
! style="background:#BDB76B; width:50%" |  Best Sound - Factual
|-
| valign="top" |
 Downton Abbey – Nigel Heath, Alex Sawyer, Adam Armitage, Mark Holding South Riding – Alistair Crocker, Paul Hamblin, Alex Ellerington, Jeff Richardson
 The Promise – Graham Headicar, Stuart Hilliker, Matt Skelding, Simon Clark
 Mad Dogs – Adrian Rhodes, Reg Mills, Ben Norrington
 Any Human Heart – Sound Team
| valign="top" |
 Elgar: The Man Behind the Mask – Paul Paragon, Jez Spencer, Mike Hatch Human Planet (Episode: "Oceans – Into the Blue") – Martyn Harries, Kate Hopkins
 Human Planet (Episode: "Jungles – People of the Trees") – Willow Murton, Kate Hopkins, Mark Ferda, Rachael Kinley
 Top Gear: Middle East Special – Sound Team
|-
|-
! style="background:#BDB76B; width:50%" |  Best Entertainment Craft Team
! style="background:#BDB76B; width:50%" |  Best Digital Creativity
|-
| valign="top" |
 The Cube – Barry Osment, Nick Foster, Peter Johnston, Julian Healy The X Factor – Robert Edwards, Dave Davey, Simon Tyers, Florian Wieder
 Strictly Come Dancing – Su Judd, Patrick Doherty, Mark Kenyon, Lisa Armstrong
 The Apprentice – Mark Saben, Andy Devonshire, Stephen Day, James Clarke
| valign="top" |
 The Million Pound Drop Live – Nick Hall, Luc Houselander, Simon Brickle, Jody Smith The Big Fish Fight – Will Anderson, Jo Haslam, Simon Deverell, Murry Toms
 Misfits – Matt Jarvis, Chloe Moss, Owen Priestly, Carl Hodler
 This Morning – Ritchie Wilkinson, Hayley Jones, John Palmer, Helen Pendlebury
|-
|-
|}

Special awards
 Springwatch

See also
 2011 British Academy Television Awards

References

External links
British Academy Craft Awards official website

2011 television awards
2011 in British television
2011 in London
May 2011 events in the United Kingdom
2011